The 2021 Australian Swimming Trials was a sports event that was held from 12 to 17 June 2021 at the South Australia Aquatic and Leisure Centre to determine Australia's swimming team to the 2020 Summer Olympics and 2020 Paralympics.

Olympic Qualification criteria

Australia can select a maximum of 56 swimmers (26 of each sex, with up to 18 for relay only swimmers) for the Olympic team. To qualify, a swimmer must reach the allotted Olympic Qualifying Time (OQT) and finish in the top 2 positions in the "A" final. Following the end of the qualification period, FINA will assess the number of athletes having achieved the OQT, the number of relay-only swimmers, and the number of Universality places, before inviting athletes with OST to fulfil the total quota of 878. Additionally, OST places will be distributed by event according to the position of the FINA World Rankings during the qualifying deadline.

Olympic Qualifying Times

 Information retrieved from Swimming Australia. and from Swimming at the 2020 Summer Olympics – Qualification.

Paralympic Qualification criteria

Qualification requirements to be included in the Paralympic team is decided upon different classifications based on the degree of impairment an athlete experiences relative to an able-bodied swimmer's speed and performance. The three impairment groups at the Paralympic Games for swimming are physical, vision and intellectual. In addition, strokes and events are classified under "sport classes" that have a prefix letter and number. At the 2021 trials, qualification is selected based on a points system rather than time. Swimmers earn points based on how close they are to the world record in their respective qualification. This system is called the Multi-Class Point Score.

Event key 
There are three swimming sport class prefixes for swimming strokes: 
 S is for freestyle, butterfly and backstroke events. 
 SB is for breaststroke
 SM is for individual medley events.

As well as swimming strokes, they are also divided into ten different categories:
 S1/SB1: swimmers who may have tetraplegia or some form of loss of muscular power in their legs, arms and hands. These swimmers would regularly use a wheelchair.
 S2/SB1: swimmers who may have limited function in their hands, trunk and legs and mainly rely on their arms to swim.
 S3/SB2: swimmers who have leg or arm amputations, have severe coordination problems in their limbs or have to swim with their arms but don't use their trunk or legs.
 S4/SB3: swimmers who have a function in their hands and arms but can't use their trunk or legs to swim or they have three amputated limbs.
 S5/SB4: swimmers who have hemiplegia, paraplegia or short stature.
 S6/SB5: swimmers who have short stature or arm amputations or some form of coordination problem on one side of their body.
 S7/SB6: swimmers who have one leg and one arm amputation on the opposite side or paralysis on one side of their body. These swimmers have full control of their arms and trunk but variable function in their legs.
 S8/SB7: swimmers who have a single amputation or restrictive movement in their hip, knee and ankle joints.
 S9/SB8: swimmers who have joint restrictions in one leg or double below-the-knee amputations.
 S10/SB9: swimmers who have minor physical impairments, for example, loss of one hand.
 S11/SB11: swimmers who have severe visual impairments and have very low or no light perception, such as blindness, they are required to wear blackened goggles to compete. They use tappers when competing in swimming events.
 S12/SB12: swimmers who have a moderate visual impairment and have a visual field of fewer than 5 degrees radius. They are required to wear blackened goggles to compete. They may wish to use a tapper.
 S13/SB13: swimmers who have a minor visual impairment and have high visual acuity. They are required to wear blackened goggles to compete. They may wish to use a tapper.
 S14/SB14: swimmers who have intellectual impairment.

Schedule
The event is scheduled with morning and evening sessions from 12 to 17 June 2021. Morning sessions are for heats while evening ones are for finals and coincided with qualifications for the Olympic team.
 

M = Morning session, E = Evening session

Olympic qualifications schedule

Paralympic qualifications schedule

Results 
Key:

Legend:

Olympic trials results

Men's

Women's

Paralympic trials events

Men's

Women's

 Information retrieved from Swimming Australia.

Records
During the 2021 Australian Swimming Championships the following records were set.

World records

Commonwealth records

Australian records

Olympic and Paralympic Team

For the Olympic team, up to 56 athletes will be selected and finalised on 17 June 2021. The following table includes athletes who were placed in the top 2 in the finals within the OQT, considered for relay events or selected as part of additional FINA selection. The Paralympic team is selected differently from the Olympic team and is based on a points system rather than just time.

Olympic team

Paralympic team

Controversy
Days before the event, Madeline Groves, a dual silver medallist at the 2016 Summer Olympics withdrew from the trials as "a lesson to all misogynistic perverts in sport". Groves' withdrawal and comments drew considerable media attention and concerns from Swimming Australia President Kieren Perkins. On June 12 at the start of the trials, Swimming Australia announced that they were setting up an independent panel to investigate issues relating to the experiences of girls and women in the sport.

Broadcast
The trials marked the second time Amazon Prime Video broadcast the event via its streaming platform. Grant Hackett, Nicole Livingstone, Annabelle Williams and Giaan Rooney alongside Matt White and Jon Harker were announced as the commentators for Amazon Prime Video on 18 May 2021. The commentary team was also joined by former Olympic medallists James Magnussen and Jodie Henry as poolside interviewers.

See also
Swimming at the 2020 Summer Olympics
Australia at the 2020 Summer Olympics
Australia at the 2020 Summer Paralympics
2020 Summer Olympics
2020 Summer Paralympics

Notes

References

Swimming
2021 in swimming
Australian Swimming Championships
Sports competitions in Adelaide
2010s in South Australia
April 2021 sports events in Australia
Australia at the Olympics
Australia at the Paralympics
Olympics trials